Lichinga Airport  is an airport in Lichinga, Mozambique that is served by Linhas Aéreas de Moçambique the national flag carrier.

Airlines and destinations

Accidents and incidents
On 8 January 1974, Douglas VC-47B 6161 of the Força Aérea Portuguesa crashed at Vila Cabral Airport and was damaged beyond economic repair. The aircraft was on a military flight from Mueda Airport and it is reported that it was hit by small arms fire on approach to Vila Cabral.

References

 OurAirports - Lichinga
  Great Circle Mapper - Lichinga

Airports in Mozambique
Buildings and structures in Niassa Province